Big Bend State Park may refer to:
Big Bend Ranch State Park, Texas
The former name for Big Bend National Park, Texas
Big Bend of the Colorado State Recreation Area, Nevada